is a former Japanese football player.

Career
On 22 October 2013, Goto was arrested by the Gunma prefectural police for shoplifting two vintage boots worth ¥150,000 from clothes store in Takasaki. Although he was released from regional prosecutors office on 1 November 2013, Thespakusatsu Gunma made an announcement on 12 November 2013 that they would terminate the contract with him retroactively as of 22 October, on the date he was arrested.

Club statistics

References

External links

1986 births
Living people
Association football people from Saitama Prefecture
Japanese footballers
J2 League players
Thespakusatsu Gunma players
Association football forwards